Mademoworld is the debut studio album by Japanese DJ and musician Mademoiselle Yulia, first released digitally on September 21, 2011.
In mid-2011, preparations for the album began; beginning a world wide tour Angee Yung Robotz in April with VERBAL to promote the album, as well as VERBAL's solo album Visionair. The first single "Gimme Gimme" was released digitally on July 29, 2011 and the second, "Bam Me", was released on September 14. The album was released digitally on iTunes on September 21, followed by a physical CD release on October 5, 2011.

Track listing

Personnel
 Mademoiselle Yulia – main artist, vocals
 VERBAL –  lyrics, production
 John Fontein – mastering, production, music producer

Charts

Singles

References

2011 debut albums
Mademoiselle Yulia albums